The monument to Ignacio Zaragoza is installed in Puebla, in the Mexican state of Puebla.

References

External links

 

Cultural depictions of Mexican men
Cultural depictions of military officers
Cultural depictions of politicians
Equestrian statues in Mexico
Monuments and memorials in Puebla
Outdoor sculptures in Puebla (city)
Sculptures of men in Mexico
Statues of military officers
Statues of politicians